Kalpesh Himmatbhai Patel (born 14 October 1976) is an Indian cricketer who has played a handful of games for Gujarat.

By some way Patel's best performance came against Andhra in the Pre-Quarter-Final of the 2001-02 Ranji Trophy, when he took 6/96 in the first innings.

Notes

References
 
 

Indian cricketers
Gujarat cricketers
1976 births
Living people